Proxy Husband is a 1919 American silent short film directed by and starring William Garwood.

Cast
Violet Mersereau
William Garwood
Joseph Granby
Harry Carter
Leonora von Ottinger

External links

1919 drama films
1919 films
Silent American drama films
American silent short films
American black-and-white films
Universal Pictures short films
1919 short films
1910s American films